Gulafzo Savriddinova (born 11 September 1947 Isfara, Tajikistan) is a Tajik politician. She graduated from the Agricultural University of Moscow (1969) and the High Political School of Tashkent (1985). She started working as an economist in Shurob in 1969. Gulafzo Savriddinova also served as the head of the Labor Union, as well as serving as a head of the Communist Party and mayor of Isfara District.

References
Asia Plus, САВРИДДИНОВА Гулафзо Азия Плюс https://web.archive.org/web/20120723024936/http://news.tj/ru/personality/savriddinova-gulafzo Personality By Alphabet.

1947 births
Living people
Tajikistani economists
Tajikistani women economists
Soviet economists
20th-century Tajikistani women politicians
20th-century Tajikistani politicians
21st-century economists
21st-century Tajikistani women politicians
21st-century Tajikistani politicians
Mayors of places in Tajikistan
Women mayors of places in Tajikistan
People from Isfara